Cylindrecamptus is a monotypic genus in the family Cerambycidae described by Stephan von Breuning in 1940. Its single species, Cylindrecamptus lineatus, was described by Per Olof Christopher Aurivillius in 1914.

References

Dorcaschematini
Beetles described in 1914
Monotypic Cerambycidae genera